Lee Jin-sung (born 5 August 1956) was the 6th President of the Constitutional Court of South Korea, appointed by Moon Jae-in on November 24, 2017.

Career 
1983            Judge, Busan District Court

1988            Judge, Uijeongbu Branch of Seoul District Court

1990            Judge, Seoul High Court

1991            Judge, Seoul Criminal District Court

1993            Law Clerk, Supreme Court

1994            Chief Judge, Kangkyung Branch of Daejeon District Court

1997            Professor, Judicial Research and Training Institute

2000            Senior Judge, Seoul District Court

2001            Senior Judge, Patent Court

2003            Senior Judge, Seoul High Court

2005            Bankruptcy Senior Chief Judge, Seoul Central District Court

2008            Vice Minister, Ministry of Court Administration, Supreme Court

2010            Chief Judge, Seoul Central District Court

2012            Chief Judge, Gwangju High Court

2012            Justice, Constitutional Court

2017   President, Constitutional Court (retired on September 19, 2018)

References 

Living people
1956 births
Presidents of the Constitutional Court of Korea
Justices of the Constitutional Court of Korea
South Korean judges
Seoul National University School of Law alumni